Hardcore Gaming 101 is an online video game magazine founded by Kurt Kalata. Kalata established the site after graduating college, when he noticed the overabundance of game strategy guides, and felt that someone should create more books about gaming history. In its formative years, Hardcore Gaming 101 focused especially on games from Japan. The site has become known for its in-depth coverage of classic games and the history behind them.

Kalata describes his motivations for founding the site, "gaming history is important to me because it's important to analyze how everything is connected to each other. ... New products are always influenced by things that came before it, so it's interesting to trace where certain elements may have come from and to recognize the talents of the trailblazers."

Books 
Over the years, Hardcore Gaming 101 has also produced a number of books on specific gaming topics. In 2013, they published Sega Arcade Classics Volume 1, focused on Sega's contributions to arcade gaming. They later published The Best 200 Video Games of All Time, which examines titles that their editorial team felt were important to the history of games. In 2016, they produced a book called Taito Arcade Classics about the history of Taito, arcade games, and the gaming industry in japan. This followed with the publication of The Unofficial Guide To Konami Shooters, covering a history of shooter games produced by Konami, as well as Data East Arcade Classics about titles from Data East. By 2017, Hardcore Gaming 101 also published The Guide to Shoot Em Ups: Volume 1, which covers classic shoot 'em up titles that were not already covered in their books about Taito or Konami.

Recognition 
Nintendo Life contributor Damien McFarren has called the site "a goldmine for retro gamers, with its staff tirelessly uncovering gems from the past that everyone else has all but forgotten about." The Escapist took note of the site's "exhaustively researched spotlights on games old and new alike", calling Hardcore Gaming 101 "a website that should double as the go-to history text for everyone working in the gaming industry." Destructoid similarly said that "the site excels at unearthing gaming trivia unknown to all but the most insanely dedicated Wikipedia moderators," calling the publication a "gem."

References

External links 

 

Online magazines
Video game websites